, abbreviated on-screen as NHK G, is the main television service of NHK, the Japanese public broadcaster. Its programming includes news, drama, quiz/variety shows, music, sports, anime, and specials which compete directly with the output of its commercial counterparts. The channel is well known for its nightly newscasts, regular documentary specials, and popular historical dramas. Among the programs NHK General TV broadcasts are the annual New Year's Eve spectacular Kōhaku Uta Gassen, the year-long Taiga drama, and the daytime Asadora.

The word Sōgō (general) serves to differentiate the channel from NHK's other television services, NHK Educational TV, NHK BS 1, NHK BS 2 (closed in 2011) and NHK BS HI (changed to BS Premium).

Launched on 1 February 1953, NHK was Japan's only television channel prior to the launch of Nippon TV on 28 August 1953.

NHK's programs are produced in accordance with the Japan Broadcasting Corporation Broadcasting Code.

History

Coverage

Current

Broadcasting rights

Football 
 FIFA
 National teams
 Men's :
 FIFA World Cup (including qualifiers for Europe (all matches) and Asia (selected matches))
 J.League
 J.League 1
 Emperor's Cup
JFA
 Japan national football team (World Cup and all Asian Cup qualifiers from first round, with exclusive coverage for all friendlies)
 Women's :
 FIFA Women's World Cup
 Japan women's national football team

Baseball 
 Nippon Professional Baseball
 Major League Baseball

Rugby union 
 Rugby World Cup

Golf 
 PGA Tour

Horse-racing 
 Japan Cup

Ice hockey 
 All Japan Ice hockey Championship

Tennis 
 Wimbledon

Sumo 
 Grand Sumo

Multi-sport events 
 Summer Olympic Games
 Winter Olympic Games
 Asian Games

NHK domestic stations and FM / Radio 1 / GTV services
Places in bold refer to where the main station of each region is located.

JIB TV 

JIB TV is a Japanese television company which, since 2009, has produced English-language programs about Japan and Asia for an international audience. The programs will be shown all over the world through the English channel NHK World from the Japanese public service broadcaster NHK, as well as via the player through the JIB TV's website. NHK World TV and production company Jib was started in 2009 with the purpose of disseminating information, knowledge of Japanese and Asian culture and as a counterweight to channels such as CNN International and BBC World.

Japan International Broadcasting Company owns 60 percent of the public service company NHK and to 40 percent of businesses with stakeholders such as Microsoft and Japanese bank Mizuho. Operations are financed for the most part by the Japanese TV license payers but also by external sponsors and advertisers. Broadcasts reach the Scandinavian countries via Astra and Eutelsat satellites. The aim is that in future also be distributed via leading cable and IPTV operators.

In order to release capital NHK moved money from radio to TV. One consequence was that the Swedish, German and Italian departments of foreign channel Radio Japan were shut down in autumn 2007.

External links
 
 Japan Broadcasting Corporation Broadcasting Code 

 Japan Broadcasting Corporation Broadcasting Code 
 Japan Broadcasting Corporation (NHK) Broadcasting Code 
 History of Television in Japan

General TV
Television channels and stations established in 1953
1953 establishments in Japan
1953 in Japanese television
Legislature broadcasters